Stewart H. Krentzman (born March 30, 1951) is the founder of Hummingbird Enterprises, Inc., a private holding company involved in several entrepreneurial startups.

From 2003 until 2010, Krentzman was the president and chief executive officer of 1200 employee Oki Data Americas, Inc., headquartered in Mount Laurel, New Jersey.  He served as a board director of Okidata Corporation in Tokyo, Japan. He was responsible for all company operations throughout North, Central, and South America. Its parent company, $6.2B Oki Electric Ltd., is based in Tokyo, Japan.

Computer Reseller News selected Krentzman as one of the Top 100 Most Influential Executives in Technology. He is credited with creating a team that revitalized the Oki Americas product line, expanding to new printing areas in healthcare and high-end graphics, and revamping the original equipment manufacturer sales strategy to include the company's light-emitting diode (LED) printing technology.

Krentzman helped found New Taste Dimensions Foods, Inc.; a company focused on using steam and heat to bond gluten. The company has worked for the McDonald's Corporation in the United States and Asia. 

Krentzman and several doctors trained at Memorial Sloan Kettering Cancer Center consulted for Sheik Mohammed bin Khalifa bin Zayed Al Nahyan of the United Arab Eremites on a concierge medicine model in 2013.

He created the Business Plan with New York-Presbyterian Hospital, Weill Cornell Medical College, to expand the Jay Monahan Center for Gastrointestinal Health into additional areas of the United States.

Along with his son Jeffrey, they founded Ovenu North America, LLC., which does business as TheBBQCleaner.com, a home-based business opportunity company that began in April 2009 and has expanded to 270 locations across the United States.

In 2018 Hummingbird Enterprises launched biodegradable Scentanicals, a scented, 100% natural botanicals alternative for adding aroma in small spaces. The business was featured in the June 2019 edition of Real Simple Magazine. 

In May 2014, he was nominated as one of three consumer representatives to the State of New Jersey Medical Practitioner Review Panel. The panel reviews medical malpractice and healthcare facility or health maintenance organization privilege cases.

Krentzman, an adjunct professor, teaches brand strategy and planning and marketing planning and strategy and, along with the director of strategic partnerships at Facebook, co-teaches social media and mobile technology at the New York University Stern School of Business to second-year MBA candidates in the executive (NYC and Washington, D.C.), full-time, and part-time MBA programs. He has been teaching at NYU since 2004.

Education 
Krentzman graduated from Colonia High School (1969) in the Colonia section of Woodbridge Township, New Jersey, and from Fairleigh Dickinson University, Teaneck, New Jersey, with a BA in psychology in 1973. In June 2007, the university awarded The Pinnacle Award to Krentzman, the highest award it gives to university alumni. He holds an MA in human resources from The New School in New York City, which he received in 1977.

Career at Oki Data Americas 
Before becoming president and CEO, he held the executive vice president and chief operating officer position. He oversaw sales, marketing, consumables, engineering, Latin America, and new business development. During his tenure at Oki Data Americas, Krentzman also served as vice president and general manager of the inkjet printer line, senior vice president of marketing, and senior vice president of sales and marketing. Computer Reseller News named Krentzman to their Top 100 Most Influential Executives in Technology in 2009 and Top 25 Executives for Peripherals in 2004. "Everything Channel's CRN Announces the Top 100 Most Influential Executives in the Industry"  He was a member of the Computer and Communications Industry Association in Washington, D.C.

In October 2007, PC Magazine ranked Oki Data with the highest overall score across all printing categories in Reader's Satisfaction Survey, noting that "The Land of Color Laser Printers... Has a New Ruler: Oki Data". An article published in August 2009 by Computer Reseller News Magazine states that Krentzman was in talks to leave the company in September 2008, 18 months before his actual departure on March 31, 2010. Insiders say a disagreement regarding the company's retail business strategy led to his departure. Krentzman agreed to remain to assist his replacement, Takabumi Asahi, in the transition to replace Krentzman as president and CEO.

Unilever 
Krentzman had a 23-year marketing and sales career at consumer package goods giant Unilever before joining Oki Electric, Ltd. As director of beverages, he managed Unilever's flagship brand, Lipton tea, during the Snapple and Tetley tea wars. He had been the director of condiments and snacks, where he had responsibility for the Wish-Bone Salad Dressing brand. He also helped develop and then managed Unilever's fruit snack business, which included Sunkist, Disney, Warner Bros., Hanna Barbera, and Nintendo licenses. He and his team received 3 Telly Awards, honoring excellence in video and television across all screens, one for the first-ever closed-circuit national broadcast from NBC Studios, NYC to 20 cities announcing Unilever's entry into the fruit snack business and two for excellence in Children's Advertising. His first marketing assignment was to develop the sales strategy for the regional and national launch of Equal, the sugar substitute. During part of his tenure at Unilever he served on Marriott Corporation's Corporate Advisory Council.

Academic career 
Krentzman teaches the Brand Strategy and Planning and the Marketing Planning & Strategy courses and co-teaches the Social Media & Mobile Technology course to second-year MBA candidates in the executive, full and part-time (Langone) programs at New York University's Stern School of Business. From September 2004 until August 2015, he was an adjunct instructor. From June 2015 through August 2016, he was an adjunct assistant professor. From September 2016 through August 2019, Krentzman was an adjunct associate professor and was appointed adjunct professor effective September 2019.

From February 2009 until March 2010, Krentzman served on the Business-Higher Education Forum, an organization of several prominent university presidents and business CEOs formed to help establish education policy priorities for the Obama administration.

Community and charitable involvement 

Krentzman has been a member of the 200 Club of Bergen County since 2002, which supports the families of law enforcement, fire, and EMS personnel in the event of their death or injury.

As president of the Northern Counties Soccer Association, a director of the New Jersey Youth Soccer Association, and a founding member of the Arsenal Soccer Club, Krentzman was entered into the Bergen County High School Coaches Association Hall of Fame as a Lifetime Contributor.

In cooperation with Graceland, the Krentzman's purchased a 1955 Cadillac Fleetwood, which they had restored to become the “Twin Sister” to the single most famous car in the world, Elvis' Pink Cadillac.  Beginning in April 2007, the Krentzmans have made this car available to breast cancer organizations nationwide to aid in fundraising to find a cure for the disease that affects millions of women each year. He has been honored as the HBO / Octoberwoman Man of the Year

In 2018 Mr. and Mrs. Krentzman provided the seed funding for NJ Friends of Memorial Sloan Kettering Cancer Center to support local fundraising efforts at the Montvale, Basking Ridge, and Middletown, NJ facilities.

As of February 2019, Krentzman serves on the international advisory council of Studio Samuel, whose mission is to provide life skills training to vulnerable young women in Ethiopia.

In January 2023, he founded Survival+, (Survival-plus.org) a not-for-profit committed to improving the chances of survival for children and teachers who are the victims of school shootings. 

He and his wife Bonnie reside in the Bears Nest section of Park Ridge, New Jersey.

References 

Living people
American computer businesspeople
Colonia High School alumni
Fairleigh Dickinson University alumni
People from River Vale, New Jersey
People from Woodbridge Township, New Jersey
1951 births